Assado is a roasted fish dish in Portugal served with a Portuguese sausage ( or ), chopped bacon or , and chopped onions. The two most common fish used are salmon and cod.

References

Fish dishes
Portuguese cuisine